Protestant Foster Home, is located in Newark, Essex County, New Jersey, United States. The building was built in 1875 and was added to the National Register of Historic Places on February 13, 1986.

See also
National Register of Historic Places listings in Essex County, New Jersey

References

Houses on the National Register of Historic Places in New Jersey
Gothic Revival architecture in New Jersey
Houses completed in 1875
Buildings and structures in Newark, New Jersey
National Register of Historic Places in Newark, New Jersey
Houses in Essex County, New Jersey
New Jersey Register of Historic Places